The Association of Partisans of the Free Territory of Trieste (abbreviated APTLT) was an organization in the Free Territory of Trieste for veterans of the World War II anti-fascist partisan movement.

The organization was founded in early August 1945 as the Julian March Partisans' Association (abbreviated APG, abbreviated ZPP). There was a competing partisans' association in the area, the Italian Partisans' Association (API) which branded APG-ZPP as 'pro-Slovene'. API was affiliated with the National Partisans' Association of Italy (ANPI).

In 1947 the name Associazione partigiani del T.L.T. - Zveza partizanov S.T.O was adopted. The Soviet-Yugoslav split provoked a division in the organization, leading to the existence of two parallel APTLT associations; one pro-Soviet (known as the 'Vidalian' APTLT) association and one 'Titoist' association.

The 'Vidalian' APTLT merged into ANPI in 1956. The 'Titoist' APTLT lived on until 1964, when it merged into ANPI.

References

Free Territory of Trieste
Organizations established in 1945
Veterans' organizations